Anna Judith Katzmann SC is an Australian lawyer and a current judge of the Federal Court of Australia. Katzmann is a graduate of the University of New South Wales. Before her appointment as a justice of the Federal Court, Katzmann was the President of the New South Wales Bar Association.

Early life and education

Katzmann grew up in the eastern suburbs of Sydney, attending Clovelly Primary School, completing her primary education at Woollahra Demonstration School. Katzmann attended the academically selective Sydney Girls High School where she was elected school captain.  She studied arts and law at the University of New South Wales, graduating with a Bachelor of Laws and Honours in Arts in 1979.

Career
Katzmann became a barrister after graduating, also working as a lecturer at the NSW Institute of Technology. She was appointed Senior Counsel in 1997. Katzmann was elected as a member of the Bar Council continuously from 1994 until 2010, holding every position, including as president from late 2007 until 2009.

Federal Court
Katzmann was sworn in as a judge of the Federal Court on 2 February 2010.

See also
List of Judges of the Federal Court of Australia

References

Living people
Australian women judges
Judges of the Federal Court of Australia
Date of birth missing (living people)
University of New South Wales Law School alumni
Year of birth missing (living people)
Judges of the Supreme Court of the Australian Capital Territory
21st-century Australian judges
21st-century women judges
People educated at Sydney Girls High School